Vattenfall i Småland (English:Waterfall in Småland) is a 19th-century oil painting by Swedish painter Marcus Larson. Painted in 1856, it has been characterized as a typical example of the Düsseldorf school of painting.

References

Swedish paintings
Paintings in the collection of the Nationalmuseum Stockholm
1856 paintings